Pyrops candelaria (Laternaria candelaria and Fulgora candelaria in older literature) is a species of planthopper often placed in the tribe Laternariini.  This species has been recorded from: Guangdong, Guangxi, Cambodia, Vietnam, Hong Kong, Laos, Thailand and other parts of southeast Asia. It is the type of the genus Pyrops erected by Spinola in 1839.

Description
Like all Fulgoridae, P. candelaria feeds on plant sap: including longan and lychee trees (Sapindaceae), among others. Its long, slender proboscis is used to pierce tree bark to reach the phloem.

Members of this genus are sometimes called lanternflies (although lanternflies do not emit light) because of their notable 'cephalic process'. They are often sought-out by collectors, attracted by their fore wings (see figure), yellow-orange hind wings with a black zone around the wing tips, a reddish head and cephalic process with white spots.

References

External links
 Fulgoromorpha Lists on the Web
 Photographs of Pyrops candelaria

candelaria
Hemiptera of Asia
Insects described in 1758
Taxa named by Carl Linnaeus